Kustaa Kustaanpoika Pihlajamäki (7 April 1902 – 10 February 1944) was a Finnish wrestler. He competed in freestyle wrestling at the 1924, 1928, 1932 and 1936 Olympics and won two gold and one silver medal. Between 1930 and 1943 he won nine European and 28 national titles in Greco-Roman and freestyle wrestling.

Pihlajämaki worked as a policeman in Helsinki from 1925 to 1944, when he died during a Soviet bombing raid. A statue in his honor was installed in Helsinki in 1956, and in 2005 he became the first Finnish wrestler to be inducted into the FILA International Wrestling Hall of Fame. His brothers Arvi and Paavo were also national champions in wrestling, and his cousin Hermanni was an Olympic champion.

References

External links

1902 births
1944 deaths
Finnish civilians killed in World War II
Olympic wrestlers of Finland
Wrestlers at the 1924 Summer Olympics
Wrestlers at the 1928 Summer Olympics
Wrestlers at the 1932 Summer Olympics
Wrestlers at the 1936 Summer Olympics
Finnish male sport wrestlers
Olympic gold medalists for Finland
Olympic silver medalists for Finland
Olympic medalists in wrestling
Medalists at the 1924 Summer Olympics
Medalists at the 1928 Summer Olympics
Medalists at the 1936 Summer Olympics
European Wrestling Championships medalists
Deaths by airstrike during World War II
20th-century Finnish people